Bradford S. Smith (born November 3, 1950) is an American Republican Party politician who served in the New Jersey Senate from the 7th Legislative District from 1992 to 1994 before serving for four years as the fourth chairman of the New Jersey Casino Control Commission. He was the Mayor of Cinnaminson Township, New Jersey in 1979 and 1982.

Biography
A resident of Cinnaminson Township, Smith served from 1977 to 1985 on the township committee and then served until 1992 on the Burlington County Board of Chosen Freeholders.

Smith's father Walter also served in the New Jersey Legislature.

References

1950 births
Living people
County commissioners in New Jersey
Mayors of places in New Jersey
New Jersey city council members
Republican Party New Jersey state senators
People from Cinnaminson Township, New Jersey
Members of American gaming commissions